Joanna Mendak (born 16 February 1989) is a Polish Paralympic swimmer. She represented Poland at the Summer Paralympics in 2004, 2008, 2012, 2016 and 2021. In total, she won three gold medals, one silver medal and two bronze medals at the Summer Paralympics.

At the 2009 European Championships she won the bronze medals in the women's 50 metre freestyle S12 and women's 100 metre freestyle S12 events. She also won the gold medal in the women's 200 metre individual medley SM13 event.

At the 2015 World Championships held in Glasgow, United Kingdom, she won the bronze medal and set a new European record in the women's 100 metre butterfly S13 event. She also won the bronze medal in the women's 50 metre freestyle S13 event.

References

External links 
 

Living people
1989 births
Place of birth missing (living people)
Polish female butterfly swimmers
Polish female freestyle swimmers
Polish female medley swimmers
S12-classified Paralympic swimmers
Swimmers at the 2004 Summer Paralympics
Swimmers at the 2008 Summer Paralympics
Swimmers at the 2012 Summer Paralympics
Swimmers at the 2016 Summer Paralympics
Swimmers at the 2020 Summer Paralympics
Medalists at the 2016 Summer Paralympics
Paralympic gold medalists for Poland
Paralympic silver medalists for Poland
Paralympic bronze medalists for Poland
Paralympic medalists in swimming
Paralympic swimmers of Poland
Medalists at the World Para Swimming Championships
Medalists at the World Para Swimming European Championships
21st-century Polish women